Mersin İdman Yurdu, was a Turkish sports club from Mersin, Turkey in the eastern Mediterranean Region. The team played in the Turkish first division for 15 seasons, and after the 1983–84 season the football team played in the Turkish second and third divisions. The team was promoted to the Turkish second level division after the 2008–09 season. MİY became the champions of the Turkish second division during the 2010–11 season and earned promotion to the Turkish Süper Lig during the 2011–12 season. Previous ground of the team was 10,125 capacity Tevfik Sırrı Gür Stadium. In 2013, their new 25,534 person capacity stadium, Mersin Arena, was inaugurated on 23 March 2013 with a TFF First League match against Gaziantep Büyükşehir Belediyespor. Their main rivals were Adana Demirspor, Adanaspor and Tarsus İdman Yurdu, and were friendly with Bucaspor.

Name
The name "Mersin İdman Yurdu" was originated as Turkish equivalent of "Mersin Sports Club". In the beginning of the Republic, many of the sports clubs carried the names as such. Later, most of those clubs, either by merging or renaming, changed their names. The "İdman Yurdu" name remained for some clubs throughout the country. Later it has lost its meaning. Therefore, "İdman Yurdu" has become a particular name for the club. Then, the club adopted the name "Mersin İdmanyurdu Sports Club". In its original form, the club's name is written separately. However, because of the norm that noun phrases which have lost their meaning are written contiguously, the team's name has become "Mersin İdmanyurdu". Today, both depictions are common in Turkish for MİY: Some write it separately (In Turkish, abbreviations are possible, even if the words had been conjunct). Club website has shown divergent interests.

Their nickname is Şeytanlar (meaning "Devils") or Kırmızı Şeytanlar ("Red Devils").
Their song is "Şampiyon yap bizi / Cehennemde yak bizi" ("Make us the champs / Burn us in hellfire").

History

Mersin İdman Yurdu is one of the oldest clubs of the Mediterranean region. The club was founded on 16 August 1925 as Mersin Gençlerbirliği (English: Mersin Youth Union) during a meeting between Edip Buran and his friends İbrahim Yekta, Fevzi Serdengeçti, Asım Güler, Muhip Batıbeki, Necati Salim, Lütfi Resimci, Sami İstanbullu, Hayri Güntekin, Hakkı Cemal Üçer, Hasan Tahsin, and Mustafa Lütfi. Their aim was to provide Mersin's youth with activities to fill their spare time with sports during long, hot summer days in Mersin. Later, the club obtained a license with the participation of other founders, namely İbrahim Bigam, İhsan Dağıstan, Hamit Abey, Rauf Süleymaniyeli, Semih Can, Ömer, Cevdet Türkmenli, Kazım Kırzade, and Muharrem Yeğin.

The first colors of the team were red and white. The club changed its name to Mersin İdman Yurdu in 1926, and their colors were changed to red and dark blue. The logo was established as three connected circles, the center circle in red and the left and right circles in dark blue.

Mersin İdman Yurdu had won the regional title every year since its foundation until 1964, except during the 1949–50 season when Mersin Demirspor captured the title. In 1944, the team reached the third place in the Turkish Football Championship. In 1952, the club inaugurated their new stadium, Tevfik Sırrı Gür Stadyumu, by playing an opening match that was tied 3–3 with Galatasaray.

In 1957, the club became sponsored by the Çukurova Group and adopted the name Çukurova İdmanyurdu. The team again finished third in the Turkish Amateur Championship. Çukurova İdmanyurdu, as "a rather well-known amateur club from the city of Mersin", turned professional and was promoted to Turkey's first second level league founded in 1963. Çukurova İdmanyurdu again became the amateur champions of Turkey in 1963. When they became a part of the Turkish second division they were one of only three clubs that came from outside of the major cities of Istanbul, Ankara, and İzmir, the other clubs being Adana Demirspor and Bursaspor.

In June 1966 the club changed its name to Mersin İdman Yurdu after three seasons and became champions of the Turkish second division in the 1966–67 season. At the end of that season they won the Prime Minister's Cup by defeating the Amateur League champions. Beginning in the 1967–68 season they played in the Turkish top level division (Süper Lig) for 7 consecutive years and 11 years in total.

After the 1982–83 season, MİY was relegated from the Süper Lig. They played in the second division until the formation of a one-group second level division in 2001–02. Because of their place in the 2000–01 season they were automatically relegated to third level formed under the name of "Second League, Category B". They spent one season there and were promoted to the second division (Second League, Category A). After the 2005–06 season, they were relegated to the third division again.

In 2008, Ali Kahramanlı was elected president of the club. They finished the 2008–09 season in the TFF Second League playoffs in second place and advanced to the second division, now with the name TFF First League, also known as Bank Asya 1. Lig. After spending two seasons in the TFF First League, MİY became the champions of 2010–11 Bank Asya 1. Lig and were promoted to 2011–12 Süper Lig after being absent from the Süper Lig for 28 years. Their championship was widely attributed to coach Nurullah Sağlam, who took over the team after the 9th week during that season. They finished Süper Lig as 12th in the 2011–12 season but relegated again to First League after finishing 18th or last in the 2012–13 season. MİY finished the First League as 6th and qualified for the promotion play-offs in the 2013–14 season. They beat Orduspor 3–0 on aggregate and 2–0 Samsunspor and returned to top level at the first attempt. MİY finished the 2014-15 season as seventh. However, next season was a disaster for MİY due to financial problems. Eventually MİY relegated to second level after a 2-0 defeat to Çaykur Rizespor on 29 April 2016.

After the city of Mersin hosted the 2013 Mediterranean Games, there was an urgent need to build a modern stadium in the city. After the games were over, the club started to use the stadium for their league games. The stadium has a capacity of 25,534 people and it is one of the most modern stadiums in Turkey.

Honours
Domestic competitions
 Turkish Football Championship
 Third place (1): 1944
 Prime Minister's Cup
 Winners (1): 1967
 Turkish Cup
 Runners-up (1): 1982–83
 Turkish Amateur Football Championship
 Winners (1): 1963

Regional competitions
 Adana Professional Football League
 Winners (1): 1959–60
 Adana Football League
 Winners (4): 1926, 1927, 1931, 1933

Others
 1969 Friendship Cup
 Third place (1): 1969 (Represented Turkey in a friendly tournament, and played four matches against Pakistan, Spartak Moscow, Iran, and Iraq in a one-leg league system; finished third with 2 wins and 2 losses. See MİY 1968–69 for details)

League participations
Before 2001
 First Level: First League: 1967–68, 1968–69, 1969–70, 1970–71, 1971–72, 1972–73, 1973–74, 1976–77, 1977–78, 1980–81, 1982–83.
 Second Level: Second League: 1963–64, 1964–65, 1965–66, 1966–67, 1974–75, 1975–76, 1978–79, 1979–80, 1981–82, 1983–84, 1984–85, 1985–86, 1986–87, 1987–88, 1988–89, 1989–90, 1990–91, 1991–92, 1992–93, 1993–94, 1994–95, 1995–96, 1996–97, 1997–98, 1998–99, 1999–00, 2000–01.

After 2001
 First Level: Süper Lig: 2011–12, 2012–13, 2014–15, 2015–16
 Second Level: Lig A/TFF First League: 2002–03, 2003–04, 2004–05, 2005–06, 2009–10, 2010–11, 2013–14, 2016–17.
 Third Level: Lig B/TFF Second League: 2001–02, 2006–07, 2007–08, 2008–09.

All time league table

Note: 2011–12 stats are not included. Play-off games are not included. Before 1987 two-points-for-a-win rule was accepted.

Seasonal league table
Mersin İdman Yurdu professional league participations by season.

Note: Classification group statistics are accumulated on normal season. Note (*): The team played as "Çukurova İdmanyurdu".League and group colors: Green: Promoted; Light green: Qualified; Pink: Relegated.

Play-off games
 2013–14 – Turkish First League championship game: Mersin İdman Yurdu 2–0 Samsunspor
 1998–99 – Turkish Second League play-offs quarter-finals: Çaykur Rizespor 2–0 Mersin İdman Yurdu
 1996–97 – Turkish Second League play-offs quarter-finals: Kartalspor 2–0 Mersin İdman Yurdu 
 1979–80 – Turkish Second League championship game: Kocaelispor 2–2 (pen: 4–2) Mersin İdman Yurdu
 1975–76 – Turkish Second League championship game: Samsunspor 3–1 Mersin İdman Yurdu
 1966–67 – Turkish Second League championship game: Mersin İdman Yurdu 2–0 Bursaspor

Turkish Cup participations
Participated in the Turkish Cup since 1962.
 Runners-up: 1982–83
 Eliminated at quarter-finals: 1980–81
 Eliminated at Sixth Round: 1981–82
 Eliminated at fourth round: 1975–76, 1976–77, 1978–79, 1983–84, 1997–98
 Eliminated at third round: 1963–64, 1964–65, 1966–67, 1977–78, 1979–80, 1991–92, 1994–95, 1995–96, 1996–97, 2005–06 (group stage), 2009–10, 2010–11
 Eliminated at second round: 1962–63, 1967–68, 1969–70, 1970–71, 1972–73, 1989–90, 1990–91, 1993–94, 1998–99, 1999–00, 2003–04, 2004–05
 Eliminated at first round: 1968–69, 1984–85, 1985–86, 1986–87, 1992–93, 2002–03, 2006–07

All-time competition statistics

Note: 2011–12 stats are not included. Before 1987 two-points-for-a-win rule was accepted. Serial penalties included in the match scores.

Seasonal competition statistics

Note: Serial penalties added to match scores. Before 1987, two points for a win rule accepted.

European participations

European Cup Winners' Cup

Current squad

Presidents
 Current President: Mahmut Karak since 25 February 2017.

Former presidents

Sources: Club history

Coaches
 Head coach:  Levent Eriş since 3 March 2017.

Former coachesNote:'' Start dates of coaches who started regularly have been shown as 1 August, before 1990, if there was no TFF records.

See also
 Football in Turkey

References

External links
TFF (Turkish Football Federation) team page

 
Sport in Mersin
Football clubs in Turkey
Association football clubs established in 1925
1925 establishments in Turkey
2019 disestablishments in Turkey
Association football clubs disestablished in 2019
Süper Lig clubs